Sabin is a city in Clay County, Minnesota, United States. The population was 619 at the 2020 census.

History
A post office called Sabin has been in operation since 1881. The city was named for Dwight M. Sabin, a United States Senator from Minnesota.

Geography
The altitude is approximately 915 feet.

Demographics

2010 census
As of the census of 2010, there were 522 people, 180 households, and 140 families living in the city. The racial makeup of the city was 97.7% White, 0.2% Native American, 1.1% from other races, and 1.0% from two or more races. Hispanic or Latino of any race were 2.5% of the population.

There were 180 households, of which 46.1% had children under the age of 18 living with them, 67.2% were married couples living together, 5.6% had a female householder with no husband present, 5.0% had a male householder with no wife present, and 22.2% were non-families. 17.2% of all households were made up of individuals, and 3.4% had someone living alone who was 65 years of age or older. The average household size was 2.90 and the average family size was 3.32.

The median age in the city was 31.2 years. 32.6% of residents were under the age of 18; 8.2% were between the ages of 18 and 24; 32.6% were from 25 to 44; 22.1% were from 45 to 64; and 4.4% were 65 years of age or older. The gender makeup of the city was 51.9% male and 48.1% female.

2000 census
As of the census of 2000, there were 421 people, 152 households, and 117 families living in the city. The racial makeup of the city was 98.10% White, 0.24% African American, 0.48% Native American, 0.24% Asian, 0.71% from other races, and 0.24% from two or more races. Hispanic or Latino of any race were 0.95% of the population.

There were 152 households, out of which 46.1% had children under the age of 18 living with them, 69.1% were married couples living together, 5.9% had a female householder with no husband present, and 22.4% were non-families. 15.8% of all households were made up of individuals, and 3.9% had someone living alone who was 65 years of age or older. The average household size was 2.77 and the average family size was 3.15.

In the city, the population was spread out, with 29.2% under the age of 18, 7.1% from 18 to 24, 38.0% from 25 to 44, 18.8% from 45 to 64, and 6.9% who were 65 years of age or older. The median age was 32 years. For every 100 females, there were 106.4 males. For every 100 females age 18 and over, there were 112.9 males.

The median income for a household in the city was $43,523, and the median income for a family was $51,250. Males had a median income of $31,838 versus $19,886 for females. The per capita income for the city was $15,776.  About 2.7% of families and 6.4% of the population were below the poverty line, including 4.7% of those under age 18 and none of those age 65 or over.

Economy
The first Scheels opened in Sabin. Scheels was founded by Frederick A. Scheel. Scheels has now grown to be an amazing sporting goods store with locations throughout the United States. Every year the city holds a series of events called "Sabin Harvest Days" with events for both kids and adults.

References

Cities in Clay County, Minnesota
Cities in Minnesota